Margaret Campbell (December 15, 1912 – April 19, 1999) was a politician in Ontario, Canada. She was a Liberal member of the Legislative Assembly of Ontario who represented the downtown Toronto riding of St. George. Prior to her provincial role she served as a municipal councillor in Toronto from 1958 to 1962 and then as a member of the Board of Control from 1964 to 1969. She ran for mayor of Toronto in 1969 but came in second to William Dennison.

Background
Born Margaret Elizabeth Fasken Baird, she was raised in Rosedale and attend Bishop Strachan School, University College and then Osgoode Hall Law School and was called to the bar in 1937. She married filmmaker and aviator Sterling Campbell in 1942. During the Second World War she worked in counter-intelligence for the Royal Canadian Mounted Police (RCMP).

Her son Sterling Campbell served a term as a Liberal MPP from Sudbury. Campbell had two daughters, Penelope (Bartok) and Susan (Makela).

Municipal politics
Her husband ran for city council in the 1956 election, but was unsuccessful. In the next city elections she ran herself, and was victorious in Ward 2. In the 1960 election she finished first in the ward, entitling her a position on Metro Council in addition to the Toronto seat. In 1966 she became the second woman to win a seat on the four member Board of Control and became the city's budget chief.

In the 1969 election she ran for mayor, attempting to become the first female mayor of the city. Her opponents were the NDP-linked incumbent William Dennison and the official Liberal candidate Stephen Clarkson. Campbell had been a member of the Progressive Conservative party for many years. Her mayoral campaign was run on an explicitly reform platform, calling for an end to megaprojects and the adoption of Jane Jacobs styled urbanism as advocated by David Crombie. She finished second to Dennison, losing by some 13,000 votes.

Provincial politics
She briefly left politics to serve as a provincial court judge. When Allan Lawrence retired from the legislature and opened the provincial seat of St. George she resigned her judgeship and ran for the Ontario Liberal Party, leaving the Tory party. St. George had been a staunchly Tory seat for decades, and Campbell faced a prominent opponent in Roy McMurtry, but she was victorious becoming the first woman elected as an Ontario Liberal Party MPP. She was re-elected in 1975 and 1977. She represented the riding until 1981, advocating on issues related to poverty, and in favour of women's and gay rights. She resigned her seat prior to the 1981 election so that she could spend more time with her ailing husband.

In 1984, the Ontario Liberal Party established the Margaret Campbell Fund which supports female candidates who run for the party.

References

Notes

Citations

Other references
 Obituary Margaret Campbell city councillor, MPP. Alan Barnes. Toronto Star. Toronto, Ont.: Apr 21, 1999. pg. 1

External links
 

1912 births
1999 deaths
Ontario Liberal Party MPPs
Toronto city councillors
Women MPPs in Ontario
Women municipal councillors in Canada
Lawyers in Ontario
Judges in Ontario
Canadian women's rights activists
Canadian LGBT rights activists
Canadian women lawyers
20th-century Canadian lawyers
20th-century Canadian women politicians
20th-century women lawyers
Women civil rights activists